Sergey Bogdan (born March 27, 1962) is the chief test pilot (since 2000) for Sukhoi and Hero of Russia. He routinely performs at international air shows.

References 

1962 births
Living people
Heroes of the Russian Federation
Russian test pilots